May 25 - Eastern Orthodox Church calendar - May 27

All fixed commemorations below celebrated on June 8 by Orthodox Churches on the Old Calendar.

For May 26th, Orthodox Churches on the Old Calendar commemorate the Saints listed on May 13.

Saints
 Apostles Carpus and Alphaeus (possibly Cleopas) of the Seventy Apostles (1st century)
 Martyrs Abercius and Helen, children of Apostle Alphaeus (1st century)
 Martyr Julius, Roman soldier, by beheading, at Dorostolum in Mysia (Asia Minor) (302)
 Saint Synesius, Bishop of Karpasia in Cyprus, Wonderworker  (c. 5th century)
 Venerable John of Psichaita the Confessor, of Constantinople (c. 825) (see also May 7)

Pre-Schism Western saints
 Hieromartyr Zacharias, Bishop of Vienne, suffered under Trajan (106)
 Hieromartyr Simitrius priest, and 22 other martyrs, who suffered under Antoninus Pius, at Rome (159)
 Saint Eleutherius, Pope of Rome (189)
 Saints Fugatius (Fagan) and Damian (Deruvian), sent by Pope Eleutherius to England to preach the Gospel (2nd century)
 Martyr Priscus, a Roman legionary officer, and a great multitude of other Christians of Besançon, near Auxerre (272)
 Martyrs Felicissimus, Heraclius, and Paulinus, at Todi in Umbria (303) 
 Martyr Quadratus, a martyr in North Africa.
 Saint Bécán, a hermit near Cork in Ireland in the time of St Columba; founder of Kilbeggan, Westmeath, worked in a monastery there (6th century)
 Saint Augustine of Canterbury, Evangelizer of England (605) 
 Saint Oduvald, a noble who became a monk and later Abbot of Melrose Abbey in Scotland  (698)
 Saint Regintrudis, fourth Abbess of Nonnberg Abbey near Salzburg in Austria.
 Saint Guinizo, born in Spain, became a monk at Montecassino in Italy (c. 1050)

Post-Schism Orthodox saints
 New Martyr George of Sofia (George the New, George the Serbian) (1515) 
 New Martyr Alexander of Thessalonica, the former Dervish, beheaded at Smyrna (1794) 
 Saint Innocent, Bishop of Cherson (1857) (see also May 25)

New martyrs and confessors
 New Hieromartyrs Milan Banjac and Milan Golubovic, of Drvar, Serbia (1941-1945)

Other commemorations
 Translation of the relics of Saint Bertilla (692), Abbess of Chelles. 
 Uncovering of the relics (1521) of Venerable Macarius, Abbot of Kolyazin (1483)
 Translation of the relics (1534) of New Martyr George of Kratovo and Sofia (1515)
 The Icon of the Mother of God of Seligersk-Vladimir (16th century)

Icon gallery

Notes

References

Sources 
 May 26/June 8. Orthodox Calendar (PRAVOSLAVIE.RU).
 June 8 / May 26. HOLY TRINITY RUSSIAN ORTHODOX CHURCH (A parish of the Patriarchate of Moscow).
 Complete List of Saints. Protection of the Mother of God Church (POMOG).
 May 26. OCA - The Lives of the Saints.
 Dr. Alexander Roman. May. Calendar of Ukrainian Orthodox Saints (Ukrainian Orthodoxy - Українське Православ'я).
 May 26. Latin Saints of the Orthodox Patriarchate of Rome.
 May 26. The Roman Martyrology.
Greek Sources
 Great Synaxaristes:  26 ΜΑΪΟΥ. ΜΕΓΑΣ ΣΥΝΑΞΑΡΙΣΤΗΣ.
  Συναξαριστής. 26 Μαΐου. ECCLESIA.GR. (H ΕΚΚΛΗΣΙΑ ΤΗΣ ΕΛΛΑΔΟΣ). 
Russian Sources
  8 июня (26 мая). Православная Энциклопедия под редакцией Патриарха Московского и всея Руси Кирилла (электронная версия). (Orthodox Encyclopedia - Pravenc.ru).
  26 мая (ст.ст.) 8 июня 2013 (нов. ст.). Русская Православная Церковь Отдел внешних церковных связей. (DECR).

May in the Eastern Orthodox calendar